The City That Never Sleeps is an ubiquitously used nickname for New York City that was popularized by Frank Sinatra, in the Theme from New York, New York's  words:
 I want to wake up in a city that never sleepsAnd find I'm a number one, top of the list ...

Although New York City may be the most prominently recognized city termed "The City That Never Sleeps", and the city's subway system never closes,
the term has been applied to other cities. Below is a list, in alphabetical order, of cities that have also been called "the city that never sleeps":
 Barcelona
 Beirut
 Berlin
 Buenos Aires
 Cairo
 Chicago, in the film City That Never Sleeps
 Dhaka
 Karachi
Lagos
 Las Vegas
 Madrid
 Madurai
 Moscow
 Mumbai
 Rio de Janeiro
 São Paulo
 Shanghai
 Tel Aviv
 Valencia

Other 24/7 services
New York City's free 
25-minute Staten Island Ferry operates 24 hours a day, 7 days a week, 
with boats leaving every 15 to 20 minutes during peak hours 
and every 30 minutes at other times.

Moreover, in many "24-hour" cities plenty of eateries are open until 3am, several clubs are open until 6am and bars close 2am or a few hours later.

Post COVID-19 pandemic, many 24 hour and late-night establishments have begun closing earlier. Coffee shops in particular have been left closing by 9:30PM in downtown Manhattan - previously these shops had been closing at 12:30AM commonly.

The people who make use of these facilities, studies have found, are nevertheless affected by sunrise and sunset. 
In other words: "that most humans aren’t as influenced by Earth’s light-dark cycle as we used to be" is not fully supported; there is an observed annual shift for "a stretch of three or four months" and "then, the process reversed direction".

See also
 The City That Never Sleeps (film), a 1924 drama
 City That Never Sleeps, a 1953 film noir set in Chicago, not New York City
 List of nicknames of New York City

References

City That Never Sleeps
City That Never Sleeps
1910s neologisms